Henry Hickson (19 April 1859 – 29 April 1883) was a New Zealand cricketer. He played in three first-class matches for Wellington from 1879 to 1882.

See also
 List of Wellington representative cricketers

References

External links
 

1859 births
1883 deaths
New Zealand cricketers
Wellington cricketers
Cricketers from Wellington City